Jon Bumstead (born July 30, 1957) is a Republican politician from Michigan currently serving in the Michigan Senate for the 32nd district. He previously represented the 34th district.

Bumstead is the owner of Bumstead Construction for over 30 years, is a charter member of the Newaygo Jaycees, a member of several other local boards and organizations, and is a volunteer firefighter.

References

Living people
1957 births
Republican Party members of the Michigan House of Representatives
People from Newaygo, Michigan
21st-century American politicians
People from Fremont, Michigan